The Apia Samoa Temple (formerly the Samoan Temple) was the 24th constructed and 22nd operating temple of the Church of Jesus Christ of Latter-day Saints (LDS Church). It was the first built in Samoa and the third to be built in Polynesia. After it was destroyed by fire, a new temple was built and dedicated on the same grounds.

History
The intention to construct a temple in Apia was announced by the LDS Church on October 15, 1977. A groundbreaking ceremony and site dedication were held on February 19, 1981, with church president Spencer W. Kimball giving the dedicatory prayer.

The temple was open to the public for tours July 19 to 30, 1983. Gordon B. Hinckley dedicated the new Apia Samoa Temple August 5, 1983, and rededicated it on September 4, 2005. The Apia Samoa Temple serves members from 20 stakes in American Samoa, and the islands of Upolu and Savai'i.

As of 2020, Meliula M. Fata is the temple president, with his wife, Pono, serving as temple matron.

Fire and reconstruction

On July 9, 2003, a fire destroyed the temple. Although the cause of the fire is unknown, it is believed to be construction related. The fire occurred in the evening after workers had gone home. Firefighters from Faleolo International Airport were called in to help firemen from Apia fire station. 

One week later, on July 16, 2003, the First Presidency sent a letter to the people of the area telling them that the temple would be rebuilt. Three months later, on October 19, 2003, the site was rededicated and a groundbreaking ceremony was held. As part of the construction process, the church demolished a building on the property and built a new chapel across the street from the temple. On January 25, 2005, the angel Moroni statue that had survived the fire was placed on the spire of the new building.

Architecture
The original and the rebuilt temple use a neotraditional design with a single spire, on a  site. The exterior of is finished with granite.

The temple has two ordinance rooms and two sealing rooms.

See also

 Comparison of temples of The Church of Jesus Christ of Latter-day Saints
 List of temples of The Church of Jesus Christ of Latter-day Saints
 List of temples of The Church of Jesus Christ of Latter-day Saints by geographic region
 Temple architecture (Latter-day Saints)
 The Church of Jesus Christ of Latter-day Saints in Samoa

References

External links
 
Apia Samoa Temple Official site
Apia Samoa Temple at ChurchofJesusChristTemples.org

Temples (LDS Church) completed in 1983
Temples (LDS Church) completed in 2005
Buildings and structures in Apia
Religious buildings and structures in Samoa
Rebuilt buildings and structures
Temples (LDS Church) in Oceania
The Church of Jesus Christ of Latter-day Saints in Samoa
1983 establishments in Samoa
Burned buildings and structures